The John Lohmar House is a historic house in the Near North neighborhood of Minneapolis, Minnesota, United States.  It has several features common to Queen Anne style architecture, such as a wraparound Doric colonnade porch, a knob and spindle balustrade, and a bracketed cornice.  Its owner, John Lohmar, was a merchant and milliner of German ancestry.  Descendants of the original owner lived in the house until 1971 and preserved its original appearance as a single-family house.  The house is listed on the National Register of Historic Places.

References

Houses completed in 1893
Houses in Minneapolis
Houses on the National Register of Historic Places in Minnesota
National Register of Historic Places in Minneapolis
Queen Anne architecture in Minnesota